Mystery House is a 1938 American mystery crime film directed by Noel M. Smith and starring Dick Purcell and Ann Sheridan as nurse Sarah Keate, and is based on the 1930 novel The Mystery of Hunting's End by Mignon G. Eberhart. Sheridan also played the same character in The Patient in Room 18, released in January 1938, while Aline MacMahon played her in While the Patient Slept in 1935.

Plot
At a hunting lodge retreat, banker Hubert Kingery (Eric Stanely) announces to five fellow officers that one of them has forged documents and embezzled $500,000. Before the evening is over, Kingery is shot dead and the police officially rule it a suicide. Kingery's daughter Gwen (Anne Nagel) does not agree and asks for help from her aunt's nurse, Sarah Keate (Ann Sheridan), who suggests her detective boyfriend, Lance O'Leary (Dick Purcell), for the case. O'Leary has all of the suspects return to the lodge and begins his investigation. Stuck in the snowbound shelter, the suspects and victims begin to pile up.

Cast
 Dick Purcell as Lance O'Leary
 Ann Sheridan as Nurse Sarah Keate
 Anne Nagel as Gwen Kingery
 William Hopper as Lal Killian
 Anthony Averill as Julian Barre
 Dennie Moore as Annette the Maid
 Hugh O'Connell as Newell Morse
 Ben Welden as Gerald Frawley
 Sheila Bromley as Terice Von Elm
 Elspeth Dudgeon as Aunt Lucy Kingery
 Anderson Lawler as Joe Page
 Jean Benedict as Helen Page
 Trevor Bardette as Bruker the Chauffeur
 Eric Stanley as Hubert Kingery

Release
The film was released theatrically by Warner Brothers in May 1938 as part of the Clue Club mystery series. It was never officially released on any home video format until issued by the Warner Archive Collection in October 2010 as part of the six-film DVD-R collection Warner Bros. Horror/Mystery Double Features.

References

External links 
 
 
 
 

1938 films
1930s crime films
1930s mystery films
American black-and-white films
Films based on American novels
American mystery films
American crime films
Films directed by Noel M. Smith
1930s American films